Platylesches tina, the small hopper, is a butterfly of the family Hesperiidae. It is found in Uganda, western Kenya, Malawi, Zambia, Zimbabwe, Namibia (Caprivi) and the Transvaal. The habitat consists of well-wooded savanna and riverine vegetation.

The wingspan is 25–29 mm. These skippers are brown with light white spots in the middle of both forewings and hindwings. The underside of the wings are a light blue. The flight period is from September to October and January to April, with two broods. Adults mud-puddle, feed from bird droppings and have been recorded feeding from the flowers of trees.

The larvae feed on the young foliage of Parinari curatellifolia. They are leaf green with a brown head. The larvae create leaf shelters by taking a whole leaf and folding it in two up the mid-rib, fixing the edges together with closely spaced silk strands.

References

Butterflies described in 1937
Erionotini